The (Greater) Quichean languages are a branch of the Mayan family of Guatemala.

Languages
Qichean proper
Kaqchikel (Cakchiquel)
Tzʼutujil
Quiche–Achi: Kʼicheʼ (Quiché), Achiʼ
Qʼeqchiʼ (Kekchi)
Pokom: Poqomam, Poqomchiʼ
Uspantek
Sakapultek
Sipakapense

See Mayan languages#Eastern branch for details.

See also
Classical Kʼicheʼ

References

Mayan languages